Streetnix was a Canadian a cappella group based in Saskatoon, Saskatchewan. They performed more than 2,500 shows across Canada and the United States, at one time making over 300 appearances a year.

History
Streetnix was founded in 1991. Original members were Aaron Genest, BJ Harris, Tony Hughes, Ward Arnold, Rich Sinclair and Xylon Cozens. The group performed at festivals, fairs and cultural events as well as at concerts.

In 1998, Streetnix won the Contemporary A Cappella Society 'Pop/Rock Album of the Year' award for their album Ignition.

Streetnix disbanded in 2002.

Members 
Aaron Genest (September 1991 - April 2002)
BJ Harris (September 1991 - April 2002)
Tony Hughes (September 1991 - April 2002)
Ward Arnold (September 1991 - December 1994)
Rich Sinclair (September 1991 - December 1992)
Xylon Cozens (September 1991 - December 1992)
Dave Young (January 1993 - May 1995)
Peter Graham (April 1995 - September 1995)
Trent Funk (May 1995 - June 1998)
Joel Cherland (July 1998 - June 1999)
Thom Speck (July 1999 - August 2001)
Corey Slutsky (September 2001 - April 2002)

Discography 
Listen (1993) - produced by Don Schmid of The Northern Pikes
Time Permitting (1995) - produced by Ian Armstrong
Ignition (1998) - produced by Darryl Neudorf and Dave Mockford
The Lost Tapes (1998)
Listen (re-release 1998)
Real (2001)

Featured on:

The Non-Happner's - One Degree of Shade (1995)
Chris Martin - Self Titled (1996)
Jolene Beyette - Jolene Beyette (1997)
A Cappella All-Stars: The 1998 CARAs (1998)
Indie Buzz: Super Crunchy (1999)
Hot Lips: The Vocal Band Sampler (1999)

References

External links
 

Musical groups established in 1991
Musical groups disestablished in 2002
Musical groups from Saskatoon
Canadian pop music groups
A cappella musical groups
Canadian male singers
1991 establishments in Saskatchewan
2002 disestablishments in Saskatchewan